Nancy Skolos (born 1955) is an American graphic designer, author, educator and co-founder of Skolos-Wedell studio. Skolos is best known for her work at Rhode Island School of Design (RISD) where she has served as the graphic design department head.

Work 
Skolos attended University of Cincinnati for two years in the industrial design department, transferring to Cranbrook Academy of Art and completing her B.F.A. degree in Design in 1977. Then attending Yale University and graduating with an M.F.A. degree in Design in 1979. Skolos met photographer Thomas Wedell while attending Cranbrook in 1975 and the pair married in 1979.

In 1980, they opened the Skolos, Wedell + Raynor in Boston with partner Kenneth Raynor. In 1990, Raynar left the Boston area, and the studio carried on as Skolos–Wedell. The studio's primary format is the poster after experimentation in a variety of formats early on. The studio has received numerous awards and has been widely published and exhibited, Skolos–Wedell posters are included in the graphic design collections of the Museum of Modern Art, The Israel Museum, and the Museum of Design, Zürich. In 2017, in conjunction with Tom Wedell, the pair was awarded the AIGA Medal for their work "pushing the boundaries of art, design, and technology with a distinctive vision to find connection among disparate forms."

Skolos has been teaching at RISD since 1989 and full-time faculty since 1999.

Publications 
This is a list of books published by Skolos. The book Graphic Design Process was published in multiple languages including Chinese, French, and Portuguese.
 1979 – Translating Musical Events Into Visual Imagery by Nancy Skolos (thesis publication)
 1992 – Ferrington Guitars/Book and CD by Danny Ferrington, Nancy Skolos and Tom Wedell
 2006 – Type, Image, Message: A Graphic Design Layout Workshop by Nancy Skolos and Tom Wedell
 2012 – Graphic Design Process: From Problem to Solution, 20 Case Studies by Nancy Skolos

References

External links 
 Skolos-Wedell official website
 example of work, Translating Musical Events Into Visual Imagery (1979)

American graphic designers
Rhode Island School of Design faculty
Cranbrook Academy of Art alumni
Yale University alumni
1955 births
Living people
American women academics
21st-century American women
AIGA medalists